The Julia Belle Swain is a steam-powered sternwheeler currently under restoration in La Crosse, Wisconsin, US.

Designed and built in 1971 by Capt. Dennis Trone, the Julia Belle was the last boat built by Dubuque Boat & Boiler Works of Dubuque, Iowa. The boat's steam engines were built in 1915 by the Gillett and Eaton Company and originally installed on the central wheel ferryboat City of Baton Rouge. The engines have logged well over a million miles.

The steamer prominently featured in various cinematic adaptations of Mark Twain's literary works - firstly in 1973 movie Tom Sawyer (as the River Queen), the 1974 movie Huckleberry Finn., and also in the opening and closing titles of the 1979 television series Huckleberry Finn and His Friends.

The Julia Belle was formerly based in Peoria, Illinois, making short excursions on Peoria Lake and two-day round trip cruises to Starved Rock State Park. Singer-songwriter John Hartford ("Gentle on My Mind") was a frequent guest pilot and often mentioned the Julia Belle in his songs, and penned a song named for the boat that appeared on his Mark Twang album. The boat ran excursions on the Ohio River at Evansville, Indiana, during parts of 1975 and 1976. Later, the boat ran on the Tennessee River in Chattanooga, Tennessee.

The Julia Belle, smaller and nimbler than some of its sisters on America's rivers, has entered the Great Steamboat Race twice, in 1975 and 1976. She won in 1976, beating better-known vessels such as the Delta Queen and the Belle of Louisville.

In 2009, the owners of the Julia Belle Swain canceled their season because of the slow economy, and considered putting the steamboat up for sale. In 2013, the Julia Belle Swain was allowed to dock temporarily at Riverside Park in La Crosse.

The riverboat remained still, docked for five years on the backwaters of the Mississippi near the railroad bridge, until it was sold in 2013 to the newly formed, not-for-profit Julia Belle Swain Foundation which had the intentions of restoring and preserving the boat. The restoration soon turned into a rebuild which included a new boiler system, new generators, new wiring, gutting the interior, improving the insulation, and new windows, etc., however, the only original piece used is the frame. The new interior will be more period correct and the steamer will again be "Trone Fabulous" as she was originally built. The restoration of the Julia Belle Swain cost over $1.5 million and is expected to be completed in 2017. After she is complete, the foundation expects to keep this attraction in La Crosse to hold weddings and other events.

As of 2022, the Julia Belle Swain was sold by the Julia Belle Swain foundation to new owner Troy Manthey, who plans to finish the restoration started by the foundation, and use the boat for Mississippi river cruises.

See also

 Spirit of Peoria — boat that later replaced the Julia Belle Swain at Peoria, Illinois
 La Crosse Queen — boat that also docks at Riverside Park in La Crosse, 200 yards from Julia Belle Swain.

References

External links
Julia Belle Swain at Steamboats.com
Julia Belle Swain video at Steamboats.org 
Julia Belle Swain video at YouTube

1971 ships
La Crosse, Wisconsin
Steamboats of the Mississippi River
Peoria, Illinois
Ships built in Iowa
Illinois River
Paddle steamers of the United States
Tourist attractions in La Crosse County, Wisconsin